Hildegard Embacher (born 10 May 1967) is an Austrian cross-country skier. She competed in three events at the 1988 Winter Olympics.

Cross-country skiing results
All results are sourced from the International Ski Federation (FIS).

Olympic Games

World Championships

World Cup

Season standings

References

1967 births
Living people
Austrian female cross-country skiers
Olympic cross-country skiers of Austria
Cross-country skiers at the 1988 Winter Olympics
Sportspeople from Tyrol (state)